"Rocky Road to Dublin" is a 19th-century Irish song written by Irish poet D. K. Gavan about a man's experiences as he travels to Liverpool, England from his home in Tuam, Ireland. Originally popularized by Harry Clifton, it has since been performed extensively and become a standard of Irish folk music. The song is also often performed instrumentally.

Origin 

The words were written by D. K. Gavan, "The Galway Poet", for the English music hall performer Harry Clifton (1832–1872), who popularized the song.

The song describes the adventures, troubles, and travails that the protagonist encounters on his travels. At the beginning of the song, the protagonist of the story states that he is "off to reap the corn" meaning he is off to seek his fortune. ("Corn" can refer to any cereal grain, such as wheat or barley, and metaphorically refers to wealth.) He begins his journey by bidding farewell to his family and friends and preparing supplies. He leaves his hometown of Tuam, County Galway, on foot, and heads east, resting in Mullingar, County Westmeath, where he charms the local women with his "curious style" and swagger. He next arrives in the capital, Dublin, and decides to tour the city, but is robbed of his meagre possessions. He attempts to locate the thief ("Enquiring for the rogue"), but is mocked because of his accent ("Connaught brogue"). He hops a ship in the harbor headed for England, and is placed in the hold with the pigs, where he experiences severe sea sickness off the coast of Holyhead, Wales. He arrives in the English city of Liverpool where he is mocked by the locals because of his nationality. Losing his temper, he engages them in a fight using his blackthorn shillelagh, but is outnumbered until a group of Irishmen from Galway come to his rescue ("join in the affray"), the first people who have helped him on his trip.

Music 
The tune uses Dorian mode. It has a typical Irish rhythm, classified as a slip (or hop) jig in 9/8 timing. An extra beat or two between chorus and verse is often added. Sometimes, the final line in the verses is sung with 7 strong musical beats ( + ):
And frighten all the dogs on the rocky road to Dublin. (every strong musical beat is in bold)
Rather than with 6 strong musical beats (9/8 + 9/8):
And frighten all the dogs on the rocky road to Dublin.

Lyrics 

There are many variations in the lyrics depending on the singer.  For instance "June" in the first line is often replaced by its Irish counterpart "Meitheamh" mistaken by some to be the English "May". Most interpretations of the twentieth century omit the second and antepenultimate verse, and replace the original chorus by the following:

One two three four five,
Hunt the hare and turn her down the rocky road
And all the way to Dublin, whack-fol-la-de-da !

Adaptations
The song is partially recited several times by Mr Deasy in James Joyce's novel Ulysses.

The song serves as the first movement of Peter Graham's composition Gaelforce, which exists in versions for brass band (2000, commissioned by Foden's Band) and concert band (2001). The main theme and chorus are repeated four times, rather than five as in most modern vocal performances.

The song was adapted by songwriter Kiernan Anderson in a song entitled "Rocky Road to Edmonton"

Recordings

 The Clancy Brothers with Tommy Makem in 1964
 The Dubliners in 1964 
 Luke Kelly in 1973 (this version is featured in the 2009 film Sherlock Holmes)
 Ryan's Fancy in 1973
 Paddy Reilly in 1985
 The Pogues in 1988
 Bert Jansch in 1990
 Fiddler's Green in 1992
 The Irish Descendants in 1993
 The Young Dubliners in 1994
 The Chieftains featuring with The Rolling Stones on The Long Black Veil in 1995
 The Rolling Stones in 1995
 Clandestine in 1996
 The Permanent Cure in 1996
 Gaelic Storm in 1998
 Orthodox Celts on Green Roses in 1999
 Belfast Food on album Zašto zato in 2000
 Christy Moore in 2000
 Dropkick Murphys in 2001 and 2002
 Brobdingnagian Bards in 2002
 Cruachan in 2002
 Mad Dog Mcrea in 2002
 Blaggards in 2005
 Bad Haggis in 2005
 Barleyjuice in 2006
 Damien Dempsey in 2008
 The High Kings in 2008 and 2017
 The Tossers in 2008
 Johnny Logan in 2008, Irishman in America
 Culann's Hounds in 2008
 Celtic Thunder in 2013
 Damien Leith in 2015, from the album Songs From Ireland
 The Kings of Connaught 2016
 Lankum 2019
 The Ramparts Chamber Choir Dublin in 2020
 Colm R. McGuinness, 2022

References

External links
Sheet music and modern lyrics
Unaccompanied performance of all seven verses (Ray Begley, 2014)

19th-century songs
Irish folk songs
Mullingar
The Pogues songs
Songs about Ireland
Tuam
Works about human migration
Year of song unknown